The de Havilland Gipsy Queen is a British six-cylinder aero engine of  capacity that was developed in 1936 by the de Havilland Engine Company. It was developed from the de Havilland Gipsy Six for military aircraft use. Produced between 1936 and 1950 Gipsy Queen engines still power vintage de Havilland aircraft types today.

Variants
Note:
Gipsy Queen I
(1936) , military version of Gipsy Six II. Splined crankshaft, but intended for fix-pitch airscrews fitted with an adapter. No fittings for a VP airscrew fitted. Very limited production.
Gipsy Queen II
(1936) , military version of the Gipsy Six Series II. Strengthened crankcase. Splined crankshaft for V/P airscrew.
Gipsy Queen III
(1940) , military version of Gipsy Six, strengthened crankcase, tapered crankshaft for fixed-pitch;-1,358 built. Most of these engines were fitted with a very basic top-cover, as per the early Gipsy-Six, with no accessory drives at the rear of the top-cover whatsoever.
Gipsy Queen IV
(1941) Supercharged version, originally designated Gipsy Queen IIIS, designated Gipsy Queen 50 in June 1944. Only a handful were made. This engine was widely advertised at the time, however, it never entered production, as it was superseded by the completely re-engineered Queen 30.

 
Gipsy Queen 30;  All-new engine from this point. (120 mm x 150 mm = 10.18 L)
(1946) , 1,762 built.
Gipsy Queen 30-2
(1946) . 
Gipsy Queen 30-3
(1946) . 
Gipsy Queen 30-4
(1946) .
Gipsy Queen 32
(1946) .
Gipsy Queen 33
As Gipsy Queen 30 for pusher installation. 
Gipsy Queen 34
As Gipsy Queen 30.
Gipsy Queen 50
(1944) , Single-speed, single stage supercharger. 14 built.
Gipsy Queen 51
, as Gipsy Queen 50.
Gipsy Queen 70-1
(1946) Renamed Gipsy Six S.G, 1,889 built. Supercharged with reduction-drive.
Gipsy Queen 70-2
3.  Supercharged with reduction-drive.
Gipsy Queen 70-3
.  Supercharged with reduction-drive.
Gipsy Queen 70-4
.  Supercharged with reduction-drive.
Gipsy Queen 71
(1950) .  Supercharged with reduction-drive.
Gipsy Queen 136 
UK Ministry of Defence designation of Gipsy Queen 30-2

Applications

Surviving engines
Of the 11 Gipsy Queen-powered de Havilland Doves on the British register, only two remain airworthy .

A Gipsy Queen II powered 1936 Percival Mew Gull (G-AEXF) is owned and operated by The Shuttleworth Collection at Old Warden in the UK, and flies regularly at home, and limited away airshows, subject to serviceability.

Engines on display
A preserved de Havilland Gipsy Queen engine is on public display at the Royal Air Force Museum Cosford.

Specifications (Gipsy Queen I)

See also

References

Notes

Bibliography

 Jane's Fighting Aircraft of World War II. London. Studio Editions Ltd, 1989. 
 Lumsden, Alec. British Piston Engines and their Aircraft. Marlborough, Wiltshire: Airlife Publishing, 2003. .
 Gunston, Bill. Development of Piston Aero Engines. Patrick  Stephens Limited, 1999. .

Air-cooled aircraft piston engines
Gipsy Queen
1930s aircraft piston engines
Inverted aircraft piston engines
Straight-six engines